In software architecture, publish–subscribe is a messaging pattern where senders of messages, called publishers, do not program the messages to be sent directly to specific receivers, called subscribers, but instead categorize published messages into classes without knowledge of which subscribers, if any, there may be. Similarly, subscribers express interest in one or more classes and only receive messages that are of interest, without knowledge of which publishers, if any, there are.

Publish–subscribe is a sibling of the message queue paradigm, and is typically one part of a larger message-oriented middleware system. Most messaging systems support both the pub/sub and message queue models in their API; e.g., Java Message Service (JMS).

This pattern provides greater network scalability and a more dynamic network topology, with a resulting decreased flexibility to modify the publisher and the structure of the published data.

Message filtering
In the publish-subscribe model, subscribers typically receive only a subset of the total messages published. The process of selecting messages for reception and processing is called filtering. There are two common forms of filtering: topic-based and content-based.

In a topic-based system, messages are published to "topics" or named logical channels. Subscribers in a topic-based system will receive all messages published to the topics to which they subscribe. The publisher is responsible for defining the topics to which subscribers can subscribe.

In a content-based system, messages are only delivered to a subscriber if the attributes or content of those messages matches constraints defined by the subscriber. The subscriber is responsible for classifying the messages.

Some systems support a hybrid of the two; publishers post messages to a topic while subscribers register content-based subscriptions to one or more topics.

Topologies
In many publish-subscribe systems, publishers post messages to an intermediary  message broker or event bus, and subscribers register subscriptions with that broker, letting the broker perform the filtering. The broker normally performs a store and forward function to route messages from publishers to subscribers. In addition, the broker may prioritize messages in a queue before routing.

Subscribers may register for specific messages at build time, initialization time or runtime. In GUI systems, subscribers can be coded to handle user commands (e.g., click of a button), which corresponds to build time registration. Some frameworks and software products use XML configuration files to register subscribers. These configuration files are read at initialization time. The most sophisticated alternative is when subscribers can be added or removed at runtime. This latter approach is used, for example, in database triggers, mailing lists, and RSS.

The Data Distribution Service (DDS) middleware does not use a broker in the middle. Instead, each publisher and subscriber in the pub/sub system shares meta-data about each other via IP multicast. The publisher and the subscribers cache this information locally and route messages based on the discovery of each other in the shared cognizance. In effect, brokerless architectures require publish/subscribe system to construct an overlay network which allows efficient decentralized routing from publishers to subscribers. It was shown by Jon Kleinberg that efficient decentralised routing requires Navigable Small-World topologies. Such Small-World topologies are usually implemented by decentralized or federated publish/subscribe systems. Locality-aware publish/subscribe systems construct Small-World topologies that route subscriptions through short-distance and low-cost links thereby reducing subscription delivery times.

History
One of the earliest publicly described pub/sub systems was the "news" subsystem of the Isis Toolkit, described at the 1987 Association for Computing Machinery (ACM) Symposium on Operating Systems Principles conference (SOSP '87), in a paper "Exploiting Virtual Synchrony in Distributed Systems. 123–138".

Advantages

Loose coupling
Publishers are loosely coupled to subscribers, and need not even know of their existence. With the topic being the focus, publishers and subscribers are allowed to remain ignorant of system topology. Each can continue to operate as per normal independently of the other. In the traditional tightly coupled client–server paradigm, the client cannot post messages to the server while the server process is not running, nor can the server receive messages unless the client is running. Many pub/sub systems decouple not only the locations of the publishers and subscribers but also decouple them temporally. A common strategy used by middleware analysts with such pub/sub systems is to take down a publisher to allow the subscriber to work through the backlog (a form of bandwidth throttling).

Scalability
Pub/sub provides the opportunity for better scalability than traditional client-server, through parallel operation, message caching, tree-based or network-based routing, etc. However, in certain types of tightly coupled, high-volume enterprise environments, as systems scale up to become data centers with thousands of servers sharing the pub/sub infrastructure, current vendor systems often lose this benefit; scalability for pub/sub products under high load in these contexts is a research challenge.

Outside of the enterprise environment, on the other hand, the pub/sub paradigm has proven its scalability to volumes far beyond those of a single data center, providing Internet-wide distributed messaging through web syndication protocols such as RSS and Atom.  These syndication protocols accept higher latency and lack of delivery guarantees in exchange for the ability for even a low-end web server to syndicate messages to (potentially) millions of separate subscriber nodes.

Disadvantages
The most serious problems with pub/sub systems are a side-effect of their main advantage: the decoupling of publisher from subscriber.

Message delivery issues
A pub/sub system must be designed carefully to be able to provide stronger system properties that a particular application might require, such as assured delivery.
  The broker in a pub/sub system may be designed to deliver messages for a specified time, but then stop attempting delivery, whether or not it has received confirmation of successful receipt of the message by all subscribers. A pub/sub system designed in this way cannot guarantee delivery of messages to any applications that might require such assured delivery. Tighter coupling of the designs of such a publisher and subscriber pair must be enforced outside of the pub/sub architecture to accomplish such assured delivery (e.g. by requiring the subscriber to publish receipt messages).
  A publisher in a pub/sub system may assume that a subscriber is listening, when in fact it is not. A factory may utilize a pub/sub system where equipment can publish problems or failures to a subscriber that displays and logs those problems. If the logger fails (crashes), equipment problem publishers won't necessarily receive notice of the logger failure, and error messages will not be displayed or recorded by any equipment on the pub/sub system. This is also a design challenge for alternative messaging architectures, such as a client/server system. In a client/server system, when an error logger fails, the system will receive an indication of the error logger (server) failure. However, the client/server system will have to deal with that failure by having redundant logging servers online, or by dynamically spawning fallback logging servers. This adds complexity to the client and server designs, as well as to the client/server architecture as a whole. However, in a pub/sub system, redundant logging subscribers that are exact duplicates of the existing logger can be added to the system to increase logging reliability without any impact to any other equipment on the system. In a pub/sub system, the feature of assured error message logging can be added incrementally, subsequent to implementing the basic functionality of equipment problem message logging.

The pub/sub pattern scales well for small networks with a small number of publisher and subscriber nodes and low message volume. However, as the number of nodes and messages grows, the likelihood of instabilities increases, limiting the maximum scalability of a pub/sub network. Example throughput instabilities at large scales include:
 Load surges—periods when subscriber requests saturate network throughput followed by periods of low message volume (underutilized network bandwidth)
 Slowdowns—as more and more applications use the system (even if they are communicating on separate pub/sub channels) the message volume flow to an individual subscriber will slow

For pub/sub systems that use brokers (servers), the argument for a broker to send messages to a subscriber is in-band, and can be subject to security problems. Brokers might be fooled into sending notifications to the wrong client, amplifying denial of service requests against the client. Brokers themselves could be overloaded as they allocate resources to track created subscriptions.

Even with systems that do not rely on brokers, a subscriber might be able to receive data that it is not authorized to receive. An unauthorized publisher may be able to introduce incorrect or damaging messages into the pub/sub system. This is especially true with systems that broadcast or multicast their messages.  Encryption (e.g. Transport Layer Security (SSL/TLS)) can prevent unauthorized access, but cannot prevent damaging messages from being introduced by authorized publishers. Architectures other than pub/sub, such as client/server systems, are also vulnerable to authorized message senders that behave maliciously.

See also
 Atom, another highly scalable web-syndication protocol
 Data Distribution Service (DDS)
 Event-driven programming
 High-level architecture
 Internet Group Management Protocol (IGMP)
 Message brokers
 Message queue
 Observer pattern
 Producer–consumer problem
 Push technology
 RSS, a highly scalable web-syndication protocol
 Usenet
 WebSub, an implementation of pub/sub

References

Architectural pattern (computer science)
Distributed computing architecture
Message-oriented middleware
Software design patterns